Are You Hot?: The Search for America's Sexiest People is an American reality television series that premiered February 13, 2003 on ABC. A panel of judges including Lorenzo Lamas, Rachel Hunter, and Randolph Duke evaluated contestants on the sole criterion of their physical attractiveness. It was cancelled after one season due to low ratings.

The winner of the lone season was New Orleans native Chantille Boudousque.

While aired on prime time, many male contestants appearing bare-chested were censored at times due to lower body hair being exposed.

Format 
From coast to coast, thousands of hopefuls gathered to get the chance to compete for the crown of the sexiest man or woman in America. Talent, personality and strategy are not required, only physical beauty and innate sexiness. TV viewers had their chance to vote on the Hot Zone/Round One participants from each regions as they face a celebrity panel of experts including: Rachel Hunter, Randolph Duke and Lorenzo Lamas.

Crisscrossing America for casting calls in many cities and poring over audition tapes, the producers divided the country into "Hot Zones" that included every state. From the thousands who tried only thirty-two people from each zone made the cut. They were judged by the three celebrity panel members and at the end of each episode, viewers were invited to vote for their favorite male and female participants. The following week, viewers would find out whom America has chosen and repeat the whole process of 32 candidates from "Hot Zone 2" and so on until one breathtaking man and one stunning woman are crowned as "The Sexiest People in America".

Lawsuit 

A lawsuit filed by Howard Stern and his production company claimed that the premise and format of Are You Hot? was lifted from the Stern radio show's regular segment The Evaluators as former Stern TV producer Scott Einziger was a producer and exec on Are You Hot?

ABC and Stern settled the suit since the ABC/Einziger version of the show was a ratings failure.

Parodies 
In 2003, the series was spoofed by SNL for its "TV Funhouse" segment as Are You Hot?: The Search For America's Sexiest Cartoons, in which a 2D version of Lorenzo Lamas judges 11 popular cartoon characters, including Betty Boop, Popeye, Cinderella, Olive Oyl, Strawberry Shortcake, Droopy, Marvin the Martian, Dagwood, Optimus Prime, Yosemite Sam, and Barney Rubble.

External links

References

American Broadcasting Company original programming
2000s American reality television series
2003 American television series debuts
2003 American television series endings
Television series by Telepictures
Reality competition television series